Dorothy Allred Solomon is an American author and educator committed to informing people about the pros and cons of polygamous lifestyles.

Biography
Dorothy Allred was born to Mormon fundamentalist leader Rulon C. Allred and his fourth plural wife. She was the 28th of her father's 48 children. In 1977, her father was murdered by agents of rival polygamist leader Ervil LeBaron.

In her memoirs, Allred is open about and critical of the many problems posed by polygamy as practiced by fundamentalist Mormon sects.  These problems include the secrecy that necessitated lying to friends and neighbors about their father, constant poverty, jealousy among wives and siblings, an inability to have an emotionally healthy father-child relationship, severe sexual repression, violent schisms both from internal and external rivals to leadership, and other issues rarely encountered in monogamy. In the same memoirs she makes very clear that she had great love and respect for her father, a complex man who was as honorable as his patriarchal position allowed and whose sincerity of belief she never doubted.

As an adult, Dorothy Allred broke with her father's group, the Apostolic United Brethren, and became a member of the Church of Jesus Christ of Latter-day Saints (LDS Church), which officially renounced polygamy in 1890. She entered into a monogamous marriage and was educated at the University of Utah. Unlike the experience of many apostates from polygamous communities and sects, she did continue a relationship with her parents and many members of her extended family, who continued to accept her as their daughter in spite of their disapproval of her membership in the LDS Church.

Solomon is the author of five books, including three that describe aspects of her life growing up in fundamentalist Mormon polygamy. She is active in Utah's movement to educate people about polygamy and has been a guest on The Oprah Winfrey Show, the Today Show, Larry King Live, Hannity & Colmes, and other talk and news programs. She has also written a screenplay based upon her childhood.

Solomon lives with her husband and family in Saint George, Utah.

Publications
 (1984). In My Father's House: An Autobiography of Dorothy Allred Solomon (New York: Franklin Watts)
 (1984). Inside Out: Creative Writing in the Classroom (Salt Lake City: Utah Arts Council)
 (2003). Predators, Prey, and Other Kinfolk: Growing Up in Polygamy (New York: W. W. Norton)
 (2004). Daughter of the Saints: Growing Up In Polygamy (New York: W. W Norton)
 "Very Big Love", Marie Claire, 2007-11-15
 (2008). The Sisterhood: Inside the Lives of Mormon Women (New York: Palgrave Macmillan)

See also
Rena Chynoweth
Carolyn Jessop
Flora Jessop
 List of former Mormon fundamentalists

References
Dennis Lythgoe, "Daughter of polygamist writes of LDS women: She hopes latest book clears up misperceptions", Deseret Morning News, 2007-10-28
Martin Naparsteck, "Polygamy, inside and out", Salt Lake Tribune, 2003-07-06, p. D5

External links
Dorothy Allred Solomon : official webpage

American autobiographers
American Latter Day Saint writers
American women's rights activists
Apostolic United Brethren
Writers from Utah
Children's rights activists
University of Utah alumni
People from Layton, Utah
Former Mormon fundamentalists
1949 births
Living people
Women autobiographers
People from St. George, Utah